The Leelanau Scenic Heritage Route is a Pure Michigan Byway on the Leelanau Peninsula in Leelanau County in the US state of Michigan that follows three different highways:
M-22 around the shoreline of the peninsula between the Benzie–Leelanau county line south of Empire and Traverse City;
M-109 through the Sleeping Bear Dunes National Lakeshore; and
M-204 between M-22 at Leland and Suttons Bay.

References

Pure Michigan Byways
Tourist attractions in Leelanau County, Michigan
Scenic highways in Michigan